Charles Turnbull may refer to:

 Charles Wesley Turnbull (1935-2022), governor of the U.S. Virgin Islands
 Charles Turnbull (cricketer) (1851–1920), English cricketer